Erwin is a town in and the county seat of Unicoi County, Tennessee, United States. The population was 6,097 at the 2010 census. It is part of the Johnson City Metropolitan Statistical Area, which is a component of the Johnson City–Kingsport–Bristol, TN-VA Flag Pond, Tennessee, Unicoi, Tennessee Combined Statistical Area – commonly known as the "Tri-Cities" region.

History
The town of Erwin received its name by a mail mishap. On December 5, 1879, the name of the town was Ervin, in honor of D.J.N. Ervin, who had donated  of land for the county seat. A typo made by post office officials caused the name to be recorded as Erwin. The mistake was never corrected.

Erwin earned some notoriety in 1916 when the only known public execution of an elephant in Tennessee occurred in the community. Mary, an elephant in 'Sparks World Famous Shows' traveling circus, had killed her handler, Walter Eldridge, in nearby Kingsport after the inexperienced trainer allegedly struck Mary on the head with a hook. News of a killer elephant spread via rumors and sensationalist news stories, and calls for Mary's execution began. Some towns announced they would turn the circus away if it showed up with the elephant. So Mary's owner, Charlie Sparks, decided to execute Mary by hanging in order to appease the crowds. Erwin was a little more than 35 miles south of Kingsport, and as home to the region's largest railway yard they happened to have a 100-ton crane car that could lift the five-ton elephant. Surrounding communities decided that Erwin was the best place to carry out the execution and Erwin obliged, even though the town itself was against it. An estimated 2,500 people turned out at the local railway yard to see Mary hoisted by a crane to meet her demise. Playwright George Brant won the 2008 Keene Prize for Literature for his a one-act play titled “Elephant’s Graveyard”, depicting this story. The town recently implemented a yearly festival and Elephant Art Auction; whereby, artists paint small elephant sculptures displayed around town that are then auctioned, with all proceeds donated exclusively to The Elephant Sanctuary in Hohenwald.

Between 1916 and 1957, the Southern Potteries plant operated in Erwin along Ohio Avenue.  The plant produced a hand-painted dishware known as Blue Ridge that became popular nationwide in the late 1930s and 1940s.  Blue Ridge pieces are still popular items with collectors of antique dishware.

In 1918, group of its white citizens committed an inhumane “banishment," a violent incident that involved the murder of a black man and the violent, forcible eviction of all other black citizens from the town by a white mob. In the 20th century, the town was considered a sundown town.

Geography

Erwin is located at  (36.145036, -82.410796), The town is situated in a valley at the confluence of North Indian Creek, which approaches from the northeast, and the Nolichucky River, which enters the valley from the mountains to the southeast.  Just before reaching Erwin, the Nolichucky passes through a narrow gorge popular with whitewater rafters.

Erwin is surrounded by the Cherokee National Forest, and mountains dominate the view in all directions.  Buffalo Mountain rises to the north, Rich Mountain rises to the west, and the Unaka Mountains rise to the south and east.

The Appalachian Trail passes east of Erwin.  The trail crosses the Nolichucky near the western end of the Nolichucky Gorge, at a place known as Unaka Springs. Nearby is "Moaning Rock", a large boulder near the trail that is supposed to be the site of a long ago murder of a stranger. According to local lore, the murdered man's spirit is still around, and if anyone stands on or even touches the rock, "...it moans as if under a heavy burden."

Interstate 26 passes through western and southern Erwin.  Tennessee State Route 107 (North Main Avenue) connects Erwin to Unicoi to the north and the Embreeville area and Washington County to the west.  Tennessee State Route 395 connects Erwin with the rural parts of Mitchell and Yancey counties to the east in North Carolina, crossing the Unakas at the  Indian Grave Gap (the road becomes North Carolina Highway 197 at the state line).

Climate

Demographics

2020 census

As of the 2020 United States census, there were 6,083 people, 2,657 households, and 1,632 families residing in the town.

2000 census
At the 2000 census there were 5,610 people in 2,470 households, including 1,588 families, in the city. The population density was 1,582.8 people per square mile (611.9/km). There were 2,645 housing units at an average density of 746.2 per square mile (288.5/km).  The racial makeup of the city was 97.77% White, 0.05% African American, 0.29% Native American, 0.11% Asian, 1.02% from other races, and 0.77% from two or more races. Hispanic or Latino of any race were 2.00%.

Of the 2,470 households 23.4% had children under the age of 18 living with them, 50.6% were married couples living together, 10.9% had a female householder with no husband present, and 35.7% were non-families. 33.6% of households were one person and 18.3% were one person aged 65 or older. The average household size was 2.21 and the average family size was 2.80.

The age distribution was 19.7% under the age of 18, 6.8% from 18 to 24, 25.5% from 25 to 44, 25.1% from 45 to 64, and 22.9% 65 or older. The median age was 44 years. For every 100 females, there were 86.3 males.

The median household income was $29,644 and the median family income  was $37,813. Males had a median income of $31,894 versus $20,118 for females. The per capita income for the city was $15,868. About 7.5% of families and 13.0% of the population were below the poverty line, including 20.7% of those under age 18 and 8.2% of those age 65 or over.

Economy and culture

Nuclear Fuel Services has a major facility in Erwin. It began operation in 1957 as the Davison Chemical Division of the W.R. Grace Company. Production activities at the Erwin facility include preparing enriched uranium to be processed into nuclear reactor fuel, processing uranium hexafluoride into other uranium compounds,  and downblending high-enriched uranium to convert it to a low-enriched form for use in commercial nuclear reactors.  Historically the facility also worked with thorium compounds.

Erwin was host to a CSX rail yard, diesel shop, and car repair facility, which closed in 2015.

Sports
In 1940, the city hosted a Minor League Baseball team of the Appalachian League called the Erwin Mountaineers. The same league's Erwin Aces played there in 1943 as did the Erwin Cubs in 1944, both as farm clubs of the Chicago Cubs. The Aces won the 1943 Appalachian League playoff championship.

References

External links

 
 Town charter
 

Towns in Tennessee
Towns in Unicoi County, Tennessee
County seats in Tennessee
Johnson City metropolitan area, Tennessee
Sundown towns in Tennessee